The Anglican Diocese of Isiala-Ngwa South is one of nine within the Anglican Province of Aba, itself one of 14 provinces within the Church of Nigeria: founded in 2007, the current bishop is the Rt Rev. Isaac Nwaobia.

Notes

Church of Nigeria dioceses
Dioceses of the Province of Aba